Angelo Maria Rivato (December 3, 1924 – August 20, 2011) was the first Catholic bishop of the Diocese of Ponta de Pedras, Brazil.

Born in Italy, Rivato was ordained to the priesthood for the Society of Jesus. In 1967 he was ordained as bishop and was appointed the first bishop of the Ponta de Pedras Diocese.

Notes

20th-century Roman Catholic bishops in Brazil
Italian Roman Catholic bishops in South America
1924 births
2011 deaths
20th-century Italian Jesuits
Italian expatriates in Brazil